The fifth season of Chicago Fire, an American drama television series with executive producer Dick Wolf, and producers Derek Haas, Michael Brandt, and Matt Olmstead, was ordered on November 9, 2015, by NBC. The eighth episode "One Hundred" is the show’s 100th episode and served as the fall finale. The season premiered on October 11, 2016 and contained 22 episodes. The season concluded on May 16, 2017.

Overview
The show follows the lives of the firefighters and paramedics working at the Chicago Fire Department at the firehouse of Engine 51, Truck 81, Squad 3, Ambulance 61 and Battalion 25.

Cast and characters

Main cast
 Jesse Spencer as Lieutenant Matthew Casey, Truck 81
 Taylor Kinney as Lieutenant Kelly Severide, Squad 3
 Monica Raymund as Firefighter/Paramedic Gabriela Dawson, Truck 81/Ambulance 61
 Kara Killmer as Paramedic In Charge Sylvie Brett, Ambulance 61
 David Eigenberg as Firefighter Christopher Herrmann, Truck 81
 Yuri Sardarov as Firefighter Brian "Otis" Zvonecek, Truck 81
 Joe Minoso as Firefighter Joe Cruz, Squad 3
 Christian Stolte as Firefighter Randy "Mouch" McHolland, Truck 81
 Miranda Rae Mayo as Firefighter Stella Kidd, Truck 81
 Steven R. McQueen as Firefighter Candidate/Paramedic Jimmy Borelli, Truck 81/ Ambulance 61 (Episodes 1–2)
 Eamonn Walker as Chief Wallace Boden, Battalion 25

Recurring
 Randy Flagler as Firefighter Harold Capp, Rescue Squad 3
 Anthony Ferraris as Firefighter Tony Ferraris, Rescue Squad 3
 DuShon Brown as Connie
 Robyn Coffin as Cindy Herrmann
 Kamal Angelo Bolden as Firefighter Jason Kannell, Squad 6/Squad 3
 Treat Williams as Benjamin "Benny" Severide
 Jeff Hephner as Jeff Clarke
 Melissa Ponzio as Donna Robbins-Boden
 Gordon Clapp as Chaplain Orlovsky
 Daniel Zacapa as Ramón Dawson
 Charlotte Sullivan as Anna Turner
 Nick Boraine as Dennis Mack
 Scott Elrod as Travis Brenner
 Lauren Stamile as Susan Weller
 Holly Robinson Peete as Tamara Jones
 Alex Weisman as Paramedic "Chatty" Chout
 Mia Hulen as Marcy Prescott
 Deanna Reed-Foster as Tina Cantrell
 Nate Bailey

Crossover

Episodes

Ratings

Home media
The DVD release of season five was released in Region 1 on August 29, 2017.

References

External links
 
 

2016 American television seasons
2017 American television seasons
Chicago Fire (TV series) seasons